Stojan Radenović (born 9 March 1948) is a Serbian academic and politician. An internationally respected mathematician, he was elected to the National Assembly of Serbia in 2022 on the electoral list of the Serbian Progressive Party (Srpska napredna stranka, SNS).

Early life and academic career
Radenović was born in the village of Dobra Voda in the municipality of Bojnik, in what was then the People's Republic of Serbia in the Federal People's Republic of Yugoslavia. He received a Ph.D in 1979 and taught for the next two decades at the University of Kragujevac Faculty of Natural Sciences and Mathematics. From 2000 to 2013, he worked at the University of Belgrade Faculty of Mechanical Engineering.

In 2016, Radenović was principally responsible for the University of Belgrade ranking among the world's top three hundred universities for the first time on the prestigious Shanghai list, due to his large number of published works and citations. This accomplishment brought him to the attention of the wider public.

Politician
In the 2022 Serbian parliamentary election, the Serbian Progressive party chose to reserve the lead positions on its Together We Can Do Everything electoral list for non-party cultural figures and academics. Radenović was given the second position on the list. This was tantamount to election, and he was indeed elected when the list won a plurality victory with 120 out of 250 mandates. During the campaign, he credited the SNS with improving conditions in Serbia over its decade in power.

Radenović is a member of the assembly committee on education, science, technological development, and the information society, and a member of the subcommittee on science and higher education.

References

1948 births
Living people
People from Bojnik
Politicians from Belgrade
Serbian mathematicians
Members of the National Assembly (Serbia)